The 1928 Cork Senior Hurling Championship was the 40th staging of the Cork Senior Hurling Championship since its establishment by the Cork County Board in 1887. The draw for the opening round fixtures took place at the Cork Convention on 29 January 1928. The championship began on 25 March 1928 and ended on 21 October 1928.

Blackrock were the defending champions, however, they were defeated by Mallow in the second round.

On 21 October 1928, Éire Óg won the championship following a 5-02 to 3-02 defeat of Mallow in the final. It remains their only championship title.

Team changes

To Championship

Promoted from the Cork Intermediate Hurling Championship
 Cobh

Results

First round

Second round

Semi-finals

Final

Championship statistics

Miscellaneous

 The 5-02 to 2-05 first round defeat of St. Finbarr's by Collins was declared null and void after an objection by St. Finbarr's was upheld.
 Mallow's defeat of Blackrock in the second round was regarded at the time as one of the biggest shocks in the history of the championship. It inspired the song When Mallow Beat Blackrock.
 Éire Óg win their first,and to date only, title.
 Éire Óg are the first non city club to win the title since 1918
 Mallow qualify for their first county final.

References

Cork Senior Hurling Championship
Cork Senior Hurling Championship